Bardejov District is a district in the Prešov Region of eastern Slovakia. 
Until 1918, the district was part of Sáros County an administrative entity Austria-Hungary.

Municipalities

References 

Districts of Slovakia
Geography of Prešov Region